CFR Simeria is a Romanian professional football club from Simeria, Hunedoara County. CFR Simeria has no senior squads registered to play in any Romanian Football Federation competition, and is kept alive only by youth squads.

History
CFR Simeria was founded on 28 May 1909 as Asociația Sportivă Feroviară din Simeria  – Piski Vasutas Sport Egylet , "CFR" is the acronym for Căile Ferate Române ("Romanian Railways").

Honours
Liga IV – Hunedoara County
Winners (5): 1969–70, 1983–84, 1984–85, 1999–00, 2006–07
Runners-up (2): 1968–69, 2004–05

Cupa României – Hunedoara County
Winners (2): 1996–97, 2004–05

League history

References

External links

Football clubs in Hunedoara County
Association football clubs established in 1909
Liga III clubs
Liga IV clubs
1909 establishments in Austria-Hungary